Kevin Michael Hughes (15 December 1952 – 16 July 2006) was a British Labour politician. He was Member of Parliament (MP) for Doncaster North from 1992 to 2005.  He served as a government whip and was previously a coal miner and official for the National Union of Mineworkers (NUM).

Early and private life

Hughes was born in Doncaster, the son of a coal miner. He was educated at Owston Park secondary modern and took up his father's profession in 1970. He remained a miner until 1990 and attended University of Sheffield for three years under a day-release scheme.

Personal life

Kevin and Lynda Hughes married in 1972. They had a son and a daughter together. His son joined the Army and served in the 2003 Gulf War.

Political career
Originally a communist, he joined the New Communist Party in 1977 but left to join the Labour Party in 1978. He served as a branch delegate and member of the Yorkshire area committee of the NUM. He was elected as a member of Doncaster Metropolitan Borough Council in 1986 and elected to Parliament in the 1992 general election for the safe Labour seat of Doncaster North. As an MP, he was sponsored by the NUM, although the number of working coal pits in his constituency had been reduced from 6 to only 1. He campaigned on pit safety issues before the privatisation of British Coal in the early 1990s.

Despite allegations being made against him by fellow councillor Ron Rose, Hughes avoided blame in the "Donnygate" scandal, which resulted in 21 former members of Doncaster council being convicted for fraud offences. He retained his seat in the House of Commons in 1997, despite being opposed by an "anti-fraud" candidate, and again in 2001. He became a whip for the opposition in 1996 and was a junior whip in the Labour government from 1997 to 2001. He vigorously supported the invasion of Iraq in 2003.

Hughes is renowned for his comment in Parliament about readers of The Guardian, many of whom support Labour, in support of new anti-terrorism legislation following the 9/11 attacks:

Hughes stood down early from Parliament in 2005 after being diagnosed with motor neurone disease, which claimed his life the following year.

References

External links

They Work For You - Kevin Hughes, former MP
Obituary, The Daily Telegraph, 18 July 2006
Obituary, The Times, 18 July 2006
Obituary, The Independent, 19 July 2006
Obituary, The Guardian, 19 July 2006

1952 births
2006 deaths
Alumni of the University of Sheffield
British trade unionists
Deaths from motor neuron disease
Labour Party (UK) MPs for English constituencies
National Union of Mineworkers-sponsored MPs
Councillors in South Yorkshire
UK MPs 1992–1997
UK MPs 1997–2001
UK MPs 2001–2005
Neurological disease deaths in England